Sir Frederick Eden, 2nd Baronet was an English writer.

Frederick Eden may also refer to:

 Sir Frederick Eden, 3rd Baronet (died 1814), of the Eden baronets
 Frederick Charles Eden (1864–1944), English church architect and designer
 Frederick Eden (cricketer) (1829–1916), English cricketer and barrister
 Frederick Morton Eden (cricketer) (1829–1917), English cricketer and barrister

See also